East Tyrone may refer to:

The eastern part of County Tyrone
East Tyrone (Northern Ireland Parliament constituency)
East Tyrone (UK Parliament constituency)